Salix miyabeana is a species of willow native to northern Japan. It is a deciduous shrub or small tree, reaching a height of 6–7 m.

Uses
Like many willow species, S. miyabeana is a dynamic accumulator and is sometimes used in the phytoremediation of mercury polluted soils.

References

External links
 
 
 

miyabeana
Flora of Japan